Maryvale Institute is a college of further and higher education, an International Catholic Distance-Learning College for Catechesis, Theology, Philosophy and Religious Education in Old Oscott, Great Barr, Birmingham, England. It specialises in the provision of part-time, distance learning courses to the lay faithful, consecrated religious and ministers of the Roman Catholic Church.

History
The College has existed in its current state since 1980, when it was established by Archbishop George Patrick Dwyer, on the site of St Mary's College, founded in 1794 for both the training of priests and the education of lay pupils. It was also, at one stage, the home of Saint John Henry Newman.

In August 2019 the Institute was merged with the Archdiocese of Birmingham.

Courses offered

Centre for Catechesis and Adult Formation

 Catholic Certificate in Religious Studies (CCRS)
Certificate in Catechesis and Ministry (CCM)
Certificate in Catholic Art (CCA)
 Certificate in Chaplaincy Studies (CCS)
Certificate in New Testament Studies (CNTS)
 Certificate in the Teaching of Pope Francis (CTPF)
 Foundation in Parish Ministry (FPM)

Higher Education - Undergraduate
 Bachelor of Arts in Philosophy and the Catholic Tradition (Validated by The Open University)
 Ecclesiastical Bachelor of Divinity (Validated by Faculté-Notre Dame, Paris)

Higher Education - Postgraduate
 MA in Catholic Applied Theology (Validated by The Open University)
 Licence in Divinity: Pathway in Catechetical Sciences  (Validated by Faculté-Notre Dame, Paris)

Research Degrees
MPhil in Catholic Studies
PhD in Catholic Studies
Validated by Liverpool Hope University.

Institute relationships
The Institute is part of the Archdiocese of Birmingham, its president being the Most Reverend Bernard Longley, Archbishop of Birmingham.  Its Doctoral (PhD) programme is accredited by Liverpool Hope University. Its Bachelor of Arts and Master's programmes are accredited by the Open University. The validator of the Bachelor of Divinity and Licence in Catechetics programmes is the Faculté-Notre Dame, at the École Cathédrale de Paris. Maynooth Pontifical University, which it was affiliated to accredited a number of programmes in Maryvale, up until 2014. As well as Maynooth and the Open University, the institute was also an associated college of Hull University. In 2011 Maryvale under new guidelines from the Vatican became the first Higher Institute of Religious Sciences in English-speaking world, and became associated with Notre Dame ecclesiastic faculty.

Adult Faith Programmes
In 2012 Maryvale allowed dioceses in Ireland to run its programmes as part of their adult faith development courses, with courses being run in Sligo and Roscommon, in the Diocese of Elphin, and in the Diocese of Cloyne. In the Diocese of Kilmore courses were run validated by Maryvale and the Mater Dei Institute of Education in Dublin. The course was also launched in Motherwell, Scotland.

References

External links

Maryvale Institute

Further education colleges in Birmingham, West Midlands
Catholic universities and colleges in England
Great Barr
1980 establishments in England
Educational institutions established in 1980